Bryher ( "place of hills") is one of the smallest inhabited islands of the Isles of Scilly, with a population of 84 in 2011, spread across .

History
The name of the island is recorded as Brayer in 1336 and Brear in 1500.

Geography

The island is a procession of prominent hills all joined to one another by low-lying necks and sandy bars. It would only need sea levels to rise by a few metres for the southern part of Bryher to transform itself into a group of five or six separate islands. As all these hills – Gweal, Timmy's, Watch, Heathy and Samson – are too exposed and windswept to be cultivated and Bryher's ninety residents have to make their lives in a relatively narrow zone between hill and shore. Bryher lies to the west of Tresco, and is separated from that island by the Tresco Channel, once the main anchorage for the islands and now an area where sandflats are exposed at low tide. Off the southern end of Bryher is the uninhabited island of Samson. It is possible to walk between the three islands at the lowest spring tides.

The settlement at the Pool / Hell Bay Hotel is the westernmost in England. Without the tidal island of Gugh included, St Agnes is marginally smaller than Bryher in either population or area; however if Gugh is included with St Agnes, which is the common interpretation, then Bryher is (again, marginally) the smallest of the populated isles of Scilly in area and population.

The centre of Bryher is mainly low-lying with arable fields, pasture and housing and is where most of the population of 84 live. On the west side is the brackish Great Pool overlooked by the Hell Bay Hotel and in the south are sandy beaches, a common feature on the island, Rushy Bay being an example. The island lies within the Isles of Scilly Heritage Coast, is part of the Isles of Scilly Area of Outstanding Natural Beauty and untenanted land is leased by the Duchy of Cornwall to the Isles of Scilly Wildlife Trust which is using ponies and red ruby cattle to graze the overgrown areas as part of the Waves of Heath project.

Hell Bay

The infamous Hell Bay is on the north-west coast of Bryher, immediately to the south of Shipman Head. This Atlantic-facing cove became a notorious place for shipwrecks in the 18th and 19th centuries, although most ships wrecked on Scilly were wrecked before they could reach Hell Bay.

Civil parish and ward

Bryher is one of the five civil parishes of the Isles of Scilly, which are also wards. The civil parish and ward include several uninhabited islands and rocks, including the Norrard Rocks, Gweal, Zantman's Rock and the Crim Rocks (the westernmost place of England). Bryher returns one councillor to the Council of the Isles of Scilly, the same as the other "off-island" wards. The civil parish is not functional however, and there is no council or meeting.

In the 2021 United Kingdom local elections held on 6 May 2021, no persons were nominated to stand for election in the ward, causing another election to be held in accordance with section 39(1) of the Representation of the People Act 1983.

Demography 
Bryher was most recently recorded as having 84 residents on the 2011 census, a drop of 8 since 2001.

All Saints' Church
All Saints' Church (Church of England) is in the centre of the island, close to the east coast, opposite New Grimsby on Tresco. A church was originally built on the site in about 1742, but it was completely rebuilt in 1821-22. The church was renovated in 1860-61, when the tower and porch were added, and the east (chancel) end was further altered in 1897-98. The roof was replaced and raised in 1930. The nave has four modern stained-glass windows by Oriel Hicks (Phoenix Stained Glass).

Bryher Baptist Church

The Baptists arrived in Scilly in the early nineteenth century. The Baptist Itinerant Aid Society established Scilly as their first missionary station, with chapels on all the inhabited islands including Bryher. Augustus Smith, "Lord Proprietor" of the Isles of Scilly, fell out with the Baptists and in 1843 "caused notice to be served at all the chapels", so they were closed. However, a new Baptist chapel was built on Bryher in 1874. It continued to be used for nearly a century, before being converted into a private house in 1972.

Bryher's Quays
Bryher has two quays: Church Quay, used as the high-water quay, and Bar Quay, used as the low-water quay. The quays are used by Scilly's inter-island boats, for both passengers and freight.

Church Quay, as its name suggests, is located close to All Saints' Church, on a small promontory called "The Island", at the north end of Green Bay. There has been a quay on this site since at least the nineteenth century. The quay is shown on the OS Six-inch map published in 1889.

Bar Quay, or Anneka's Quay, located to the north of Church Quay, was originally built in 1990 by volunteers, for the television programme Challenge Anneka. It is known to many islanders as "Anna Quay". 

The Duchy of Cornwall is responsible for both quays on Bryher.

Quay renovation, 2006–2008
The quays on Bryher (together with quays on St Agnes and St Martins) benefited from a £3.5m Duchy of Cornwall renovation project in 2006–2008 to improve operational safety and reduce maintenance.

For all off-island quays, except Anneka's Quay, a common solution was provided: a new quay wall was built from prefabricated concrete block units, which were anchored to the bedrock using post tensioned bars and connected to the existing structure using precast deck planks.

Anneka's Quay was originally a timber deck structure support on sand filled caissons. The quay was lengthened by approximately 12m by adding two additional concrete filled caissons; the timber deck was replaced by a concrete slab.

On 2 October 2007, BBC News reported that before the renovation project it had been 50 years since any major work was done on the off-islands quays.

Education

Five Islands Academy (previously Five Islands School) has its Tresco and Bryher Base, a primary campus in Tresco. Primary pupils commute daily to Tresco. Secondary pupils board at the St Mary's main campus, staying there on weekdays and coming back and forth to their home islands on weekends.

Students at the sixth-form college level reside and board elsewhere in mainland Great Britain. Previously the Learning and Skills Council paid for costs of accommodation for sixth-formers.

Natural history
There are three Sites of Special Scientific Interest (SSSI) on Bryher. The Shipman Head and Shipman Down SSSI was first designated in 1971 and covers over 40 ha of the northern part of the island. Waved maritime heath grows over shallow podzolic soils which are underlain by Hercynian granite. Rare plants include the Red Data Book (RDB) Orange Bird's-foot (Ornithopus pinnatus) and the nationally scarce Hairy Bird's-foot trefoil (Lotus subbiflorus). Lichens include (Lobaria pulmonaria) and (Teleoschistes flavicans).

On the west side of the island is Great Pool which is part of the Pool of Bryher and Popplestone Bank SSSI. It is separated from the sea by a storm beach and small dune system, and is the only natural brackish lagoon on Scilly with plants such as Saltmarsh Rush (Juncus gerardii) and Beaked Tasselweed (Ruppia maritima).

Covering  of the southern part of the island is the Rushy Bay and Heathy Hill SSSI which has a number of nationally rare plants. An Isles of Scilly speciality is the Dwarf Pansy (Viola kitaibeliana) which grows nowhere else in Great Britain. It is locally abundant on Bryher and thousands can be found in May in short turf and bare sand. Unfortunately a storm in 2008 reduced the numbers of plants seen; there are also small colonies on Tresco and Teän. Orange Bird's-foot, Small Adder's-tongue (Ophioglossum azoricum) and Autumn's Lady's-tresses (Spiranthes spiralis) grow on Heathy Hill.

Breeding birds
Shipman head has seven species of breeding seabirds:
Kittiwake (Rissa tridactyla)
Herring Gull (Larus argentatus)
Greater Black-backed Gull (L marinus)
Lesser Black-backed Gull (L fuscus) 
Razorbill (Alca torda)
Shag (Gulosus aristotelis) 
European Storm Petrel (Hydrobates pelagicus)

Ringed Plover (Charadrius hiaticula) breed on Shipman Down.

Visiting the island
Varied accommodation is available on the island. There are guesthouses and self-catering cottages scattered across the island. The campsite is located close to the north end of the island overlooking both coasts. The Hell Bay Hotel is located close to the coast on the west side.

Two quays are used (depending on tides) by boats which take tourists between Bryher and other islands, including St Mary's and Tresco. On some low tides it is possible to walk between Bryher and Tresco and even Samson, the uninhabited island to the south. There is also safe anchorage for small yachts in the channel and Green Bay.

Local activities include boating, walking and watching wildlife.

Culture and Media

Use in film and television
In 1989, the island was used for some of the scenes in the BBC's television adaptation of The Voyage of the Dawn Treader.

When the Whales Came was made on location in 1989 and starred Helen Mirren, Helen Pearce, Paul Scofield and David Suchet.

In fiction

Bryher features in various books:
The Wreck of the Zanzibar, The Sleeping Sword, Why the Whales Came and Listen to the Moon, all by Michael Morpurgo, Hell Bay by Sam Llewellyn, and The Old Success by Martha Grimes

"Bryher" as a name
Annie Winifred Ellerman, daughter of the UK's wealthiest man Sir John Ellerman, took the name Bryher as her pen name in the early 20th century.

Further reading
 Scilly Island by Island: Bryher, Samson, the Norrard Rocks by Friendly Guides (2021)

See also

 Listed buildings in Bryher, Isles of Scilly
 List of shipwrecks of the Isles of Scilly
 List of extreme points of the United Kingdom

References

External links

 Bryher web site
 Visit Isles of Scilly: Bryher

 
Inhabited islands of the Isles of Scilly
Sites of Special Scientific Interest in the Isles of Scilly
Sites of Special Scientific Interest notified in 1971
Civil parishes in Cornwall